Saldanha, also known as Saldanha Bay, is a town of 21,636 people, located  north of Cape Town on the northern shore of Saldanha Bay, in the Western Cape province of South Africa. Its situation as a natural sheltered harbour has led to development as a port for the export of iron ore from Sishen in the Northern Cape, which is transported on the Sishen–Saldanha railway line. The port is one of the largest exporting ports of ore in the whole of Africa, and it is able to handle ships as large as 200 000 tons deadweight. Saldanha Bay is named after António de Saldanha, captain of a vessel in Albuquerque's fleet which visited South Africa in 1503.

Port
The port has handling facilities for both bulk iron ore and crude oil. Ore vessels up to 21.5 metre draft are handled, as well as large crude oil carriers up to 20.5 metre draft.

Demographics (2011)

 Area: 
 Population: 28,142: 
 Households: 7,654:

References

Port cities in South Africa
Populated places in the Saldanha Bay Local Municipality
West Coast of South Africa